Spodnja Besnica is a village on the right bank of the Sava River in the Municipality of Kranj in the Upper Carniola region of Slovenia.

Name
The name Spodnja Besnica means 'lower Besnica', contrasting with Zgornja Besnica 'upper Besnica', which lies  higher in elevation. The two villages were attested in historical documents as Vessnitz in 1421, referring to the stream of the same name. The name Besnica is originally a hydronym that was later applied to the settlement along Besnica Creek, a tributary of the Sava. The name is derived from the Slavic adjective *běsьnъ 'rushing, swift', referring the character of the stream.

Church
The local church is dedicated to John the Baptist.

References

External links

Spodnja Besnica on Geopedia

Populated places in the City Municipality of Kranj